Xconomy is a Boston, Massachusetts–based media company providing news on business, life sciences, and technology focusing on the regions of Boston, Boulder/Denver, Detroit, Indiana, New York City, Raleigh-Durham, San Diego, San Francisco, Seattle, Texas, Wisconsin, and beyond. The website was launched in June 2007 by founders Robert Buderi and Rebecca Zacks. Xconomy content covers "local personalities, companies, and technological trends to business and technology leaders" with a target audience of "entrepreneurs, business and technology executives and innovators, venture capitalists, angel investors, lawyers, and university researchers and officials." Bill Mitchell of the Poynter Institute described Xconomy in 2010 as reflecting "the insiderish feel of, say, Politico, but with some of the familiarity that you might expect from a small town paper."

History
Xconomy was founded in 2007 in Cambridge, Massachusetts. The original Xconomy site focused on the city of Boston before opening another outlet in Seattle in 2008 and expanding to other key technology clusters afterward. In 2016, Xconomy was acquired by Informa and moved its headquarters to Boston.

Since its founding, Xconomy has also entered the field of business-to-business event production, launched webinar and podcasting services (Xconomy Xpertise), and has formed a custom research and publishing arm (Xconomy Insight). Xconomy also provides "underwriting programs, banner ads, display ads, and ad networks".

Contributors

Notable contributors to Xconomy include:
 
  

 David Baltimore – biologist and Nobel laureate
 George Church – geneticist, molecular engineer, chemist and Wyss Institute for Biologically Inspired Engineering founding member
 Peter Diamandis – engineer, physician, entrepreneur (e.g., X Prize Foundation founder, Singularity University co-founder)
 Esther Dyson – journalist, author, businesswoman, investor, commentator, and philanthropist
 Brad Feld – entrepreneur, author, blogger, and venture capitalist
 Mary Lou Jepsen – technical executive (e.g., Facebook, Google) and co-founder of One Laptop per Child
 Dean Kamen – engineer, inventor (e.g., Segway) and businessman (e.g., FIRST co-founder)
 Vinod Khosla – engineer and businessman (e.g., Sun Microsystems co-founder)
 Robert Langer – chemical engineer, scientist, entrepreneur and inventor
Marc Tessier-Lavigne – neuroscientist, executive (e.g., Genentech) and Stanford University president
 Anne Wojcicki – biologist and entrepreneur (e.g., 23andMe co-founder)

References

External links
Official Website

American technology news websites